Mohammed Foysal Ahmed Fahim (born 24 February 2002), known as Fahim, is a Bangladeshi professional footballer who plays as a left winger for Bangladesh Premier League club Abahani Limited Dhaka and the Bangladesh national team.

Club career

Early career
Fahim's footballing journey started with the traditional Mashumpur Krirachakra Club in Sirajganj District, and was coached by former professional footballer Rezaul Karim Khokon. He then went on to join Sylhet Sporting Academy in 2015, which was shut down within a few months of him joining. By 2017, Fahim had earned the experience of playing for Bangladesh U-14,15, & 17 youth national teams. However, due to the money required to pursue football in the country, Fahim's family were reluctant to approve of his desire to take the sport as a profession. Fahim was later admitted to Bangladesh Krira Shikkha Protishtan, in Sylhet.

In 2017, Fahim travelled to Nepal with the Bangladesh U15 team, that participated in the SAFF U-15 Championship the same year, after impressing coach Mustafa Anwar Parvez during the final selection trials. He was among the 11 players selected from BKSP institutions around the country. Although Bangladesh finished in third place during the tournament, Fahim won the golden boot award, and after attracting interest from numerous top tier clubs, Fahim signed a professional contract with premier league side Saif Sporting Club the following year.

Saif Sporting Club
On 1 July 2018, Fahim joined corporate giants Saif Sporting Club. On 11 April 2019, Fahim made his BPL debut for Saif SC during a 3–2 loss against Bashundhara Kings. On 23 July 2019, Fahim scored his first goal for the club against NoFeL SC in the league. He ended his first professional season at the club with 2 goals from 7 league games.

Abahani Limited Dhaka
On 24 February 2023, Fahim scored a hat-trick against AFC Uttara in a league fixture on his birthday.

International career

Bangladesh U-15
Fahim won the golden boot in the 2017 SAFF U-15 Championship as he finished top scorer with 6 goals out of 4 matches. His goals included a hat-trick against Sri Lanka and he also managed to score in both games against Bhutan one of which came during a 8-0 trashing. He was in the scoresheet again in the semi-finals against Nepal as Bangladesh
lost 4-2 and were knocked out of the competition.

On 24 September 2017, Fahim scored a long-range winner against the Qatar U16 team and sealed a stunning 2-0 win for Bangladesh during the 2018 AFC U-16 Championship qualifiers. In the end even though Bangladesh failed to reach the main tournament, the victory was seen as a huge achievement.

Bangladesh U-18
Fahim was the joint top scorer of the 2019 SAFF U-18 Championship alongside Bangladesh U18 teammate Tanbir Hossain and Gurkirat Singh from India. His goals came against Sri lanka in the group stages and against Bhutan during the semi-finals of the tournament.

He was also in the Bangladesh U20 squad during their disappointing 2020 AFC U-19 Championship qualification campaign.

Bangladesh U-23
Fahim was named on the Bangladesh U23 team by coach Maruful Haque for the AFC U-23 Championship 2022 Qualifiers. He managed to play in  all  of the 3 games, the qualifiers ended with Bangladesh failing to score a single time. Although the poor performances shown by the team, Fahim was impressive during the games, with his quick feet and dribbling, which earned him a Bangladesh national football team call up.

Bangladesh national team
In 2020, Fahim was called up to the national team for the first time during the Bangabandhu Gold Cup. Although he was named on the final squad list, he did not participate in any of the games. He was called up once again, this time for 3 World Cup qualifiers in June in 2021.But failed to join the team in the end due to passport complications. He was also named in Jamie Day's 35-man preliminary squad for the 2021 SAFF Championship. But his name was cut off when Oscar Bruzon named his final squad as the interim coach.

On 13 November 2021, Fahim finally made his debut for the Bangladesh national team coming on as a substitute for Mohammad Ibrahim during the start of the second half against Maldives in the 2021 Four Nations Football Tournament. Bangladesh won the game 2-1 which was their first victory against Maldives in 18 years.

Career statistics

Club

International

International goals

Youth
Scores and results list Bangladesh's goal tally first.

References

External links 
 
 Foysal Ahmed Fahim at soccerway.com

Living people
2002 births
Bangladeshi footballers
Bangladesh international footballers
Bangladesh youth international footballers
Association football wingers
Saif SC players
Abahani Limited (Dhaka) players
People from Sirajganj District
Bangladesh Football Premier League players